List of former state routes in Ohio (1–49)

List of former state routes in Ohio (50–130)

List of former state routes in Ohio (142–219)

List of former state routes in Ohio (223–270)

List of former state routes in Ohio (271–352)

List of former state routes in Ohio (354–568)

List of former state routes in Ohio (569–673)

List of former state routes in Ohio (675–824)

Ohio transportation-related lists
State highways in Ohio